The Robert Larner College of Medicine is the medical school of the University of Vermont, a public research university in Burlington, Vermont. Established in 1822, it is the nation's seventh oldest medical school. The primary teaching hospital for the Larner College of Medicine is the UVM Medical Center in Burlington.

The Larner College of Medicine offers both MD and PhD degrees, as well as a Certificate in Integrative Healthcare through the shared program with the University of Vermont College of Nursing and Health Sciences. In 2022, there were 479 medical students, 329 graduate students, and 42 post-doctoral students enrolled. The entering class of 2020 contains 120 students.

The school's medical curriculum is known as the "Vermont Integrated Curriculum". It has both traditional, subject-based and more contemporary, organ/system-based components. The first 18 months of the curriculum are devoted to basic and clinical science; the remainder of the four-year program largely consists of clinical clerkships.

Education
The Larner College of Medicine offers a Doctor of Medicine degree program into which it enrolls approximately 120 students annually.

According to the institution, the Larner College of Medicine offers an "integrated" medical curriculum. This curriculum, known as the "Vermont Integrated Curriculum", or "VIC", is separated into three levels. Level one/foundations is focused on basic and clinical sciences and lasts 18 months. Level two/clinical clerkships is a 12-month period spent rotating through various clinical clerkships at The University of Vermont Medical Center and other affiliated hospitals. In level three/advanced integration, students continue rotating through clinical clerkships and acting internships with additional responsibilities. The 1-year Certificate in Integrative Healthcare is offered by the University of Vermont Institute in Integrative Health, a shared program between the University of Vermont College of Medicine and the University of Vermont College of Nursing and Health Sciences

Rank
The Larner College of Medicine is ranked in the top 100 of American medical schools. For 2022, The University of Vermont College of Medicine was ranked by U.S. News & World Report as 66th on the "Top Medical Schools — Research" list and 24th on the "Top Medical Schools — Primary Care" list.

Affiliations
The Larner College of Medicine is affiliated with four teaching hospitals, with the primary affiliate being the University of Vermont Medical Center in Burlington. A long-standing affiliation with Maine Medical Center in Portland, Maine began in the late 1970s but ended in February 2011. Three new hospitals took the place of MMC: Danbury Hospital in Danbury, Connecticut, Norwalk Hospital in Norwalk, Connecticut, and St. Mary's Hospital in West Palm Beach, Florida.

References

External links

Medicine, College of
Medical schools in Vermont
Educational institutions established in 1822
Education in Chittenden County, Vermont
Buildings and structures in Chittenden County, Vermont
1822 establishments in Vermont